Love Will Tear Us Apart (Chinese: 我想和你好好的) is a 2013 Chinese film directed by Li Weiran and starring Feng Shaofeng and Ni Ni.

Synopsis 
A simple but heartbreaking love story. An ordinary copy director Liang Liang falls in love with a beautiful model Miao Miao. They strongly attract each other, but Miao Miao's insecurity in relationships gradually tears them apart.

Cast
 Feng Shaofeng as Jiang Liangliang
 Ni Ni as Miaomiao

Reception 
 Love will tear us apart is rated 5.8 on Douban, a widely used social networking website in China, and receives a mixed reaction among audience. Only  29% users give positive credits and 32% provide negative ones. A number of viewers regard the protagonists' interactions as overly exaggerated, but there's also a major contradictory perspective, with which the audience suggest that this film reflects their own relationships in a truthful way.    
 Derek Elley from Film Asia Business gives 8 out of 10 to Love will tear us apart . He calls the film "a combination of terrific lead chemistry, a deftly constructed script full of flavoursome dialogue, and the whole package’s technical smoothness elevates the movie."

References

External links 
 Love will tear us apart on IMDb 
 Love will tear us apart Official Weibo (Mandarin)

Le Vision Pictures films
Films shot in Beijing
Films shot in Thailand
Chinese romantic drama films
2010s Mandarin-language films